Seranambia is a genus of beetles in the family Buprestidae, containing the following species:

 Seranambia nodosa Descarpentries, 1974
 Seranambia succinicola Descarpentries, 1974

References

Buprestidae genera